Ottoman miniature or Turkish miniature was a Turkish art form in the Ottoman Empire, which can be linked to the Persian miniature tradition, as well as strong Chinese artistic influences. It was a part of the Ottoman book arts, together with illumination, calligraphy, marbling paper, and bookbinding. The studios the artists worked in were called Nakkashanes.

Original procedure
The miniatures were usually not signed, perhaps because of the rejection of individualism, but also because the works were not created entirely by one person; the head painter designed the composition of the scene, and his apprentices drew the contours (which were called ) with black or colored ink and then painted the miniature without making an illusion of third dimension. The head painter, and much more often the scribe of the text, were indeed named and depicted in some of the manuscripts. The understanding of perspective was different from that of the nearby European Renaissance painting tradition, and the scene depicted often included different time periods and spaces in one picture. The miniatures followed closely the context of the book they were included in, resembling more illustrations rather than standalone works of art.

The colors for the miniature were obtained by ground powder pigments mixed with egg-white  and, later, with diluted gum arabic. The produced colors were vivid. Contrasting colors used side by side with warm colors further emphasized this quality. The most used colors in Ottoman miniatures were bright red, scarlet, green, and different shades of blue.

The worldview underlying the Ottoman miniature painting was also different from that of the European Renaissance tradition. The painters did not mainly aim to depict the human beings and other living or non-living beings realistically, although increasing realism is found from the later 16th century and onwards. Like Plato, Ottoman tradition tended to reject mimesis, because according to the worldview of Sufism (a mystical form of Islam widespread at the popular level in the Ottoman Empire), the appearance of worldly beings was not permanent and worth devoting effort to, resulting in stylized and abstracted illustrations.

History and development

Origin

During the reign of Mehmed II, a court workshop called  that also functioned as an academy was founded in Topkapı Palace in Istanbul to create illuminated picture manuscripts for the Sultan and the courtiers.

At the beginning of the 16th century, the Herat workshop of Persian miniaturists was closed, and its famous instructor Behzad (or Bihzad) went to Tabriz. There were also scientific books on botany and animals, alchemy, cosmography, and medicine; technical books; love letters; books about astrology; and dream reading.

Golden age

The reigns of Suleyman the Magnificent (1520–1566) and especially Selim II (1566–1574) in the second half of the 16th century were the golden age of the Ottoman miniature, with its own characteristics and authentic qualities. Nakkaş Osman (often known as Osman the Miniaturist) was the most important miniature painter of the period, while Nigari developed portrait painting.

Matrakçı Nasuh was a famous miniature painter during the reigns of Selim I and Suleyman the Magnificent. He created a new painting genre called topographic painting. He painted cities, ports, and castles without any human figures and combined scenes observed from different viewpoints in one picture.

During the reigns of Selim II (1566–1574) and Murad III (1574–1595), the classical Ottoman miniature style was created. The renowned miniature painters of the period were Nakkaş Osman, Ali Çelebi, Molla Kasım, Hasan Pasha, and Lütfi Abdullah.

Start of being seen as art rather than function
By the end of the 16th century and in the beginning of the 17th century, especially during the reign of Ahmed I, single page miniatures intended to be collected in albums or murakkas were popular. They had existed at the time of Murat III, who ordered an album of them from the painter Veli Can. In the 17th century, miniature painting was also popular among the citizens of Istanbul. Artists known as bazaar painters" worked with other artisans in the bazaars of Istanbul at the demand of citizens.

A new cultural genre known in Ottoman history as the Tulip period occurred during the reign of Ahmed III. Some art historians attribute the birth of the unique style called Ottoman Baroque to this period. The characteristics of the period carried the influences of French baroque. In this period, a grand festival for the circumcision rituals for the sons of Ahmed III was organized. Artisans, theatre groups, clowns, musicians, trapeze dancers, and citizens joined in the festivities. A book called Surname-i Vehbi tells about this festival. This book was depicted by Abdulcelil Levni (the name Levni is related to the Arabic word  ('color') and was given to the artist because of the colorful nature of his paintings and his apprentices. His style of painting was influenced by Western painting and very different from the earlier miniature paintings.

Depicting sexual scenes in Ottoman miniature
In the 18th century, there was a rise of Ottoman erotic miniatures. These miniatures contained both heterosexual and homosexual couples, nudity and intercourse scenes. Explicitly intercourse images by Abdullah Buhârî (1735–1745) is rare in Islamic arts.

Losing its function
After Levni, Westernization of Ottoman culture continued, and with the introduction of printing press and later photography, no more illuminated picture manuscripts were produced. From then on, wall paintings or oil paintings on toils were popular. The miniature painting thus lost its function.

Contemporary Turkish miniature

After a period of crisis in the beginning of the 20th century, miniature painting was accepted as a decorative art by the intellectuals of the newly founded Turkish Republic, and in 1936, a division called Turkish Decorative Arts was established in the Academy of Fine Arts in Istanbul, which included miniature painting together with the other Ottoman book arts. The historian and author Süheyl Ünver educated many artists following the tradition of Ottoman book arts.

Contemporary miniature artists include Ömer Faruk Atabek, Sahin Inaloz, Cahide Keskiner, Gülbün Mesara, Nur Nevin Akyazıcı, Ahmet Yakupoğlu, Nusret Çolpan, Orhan Dağlı, and many others from the new generation. Contemporary artists usually do not consider miniature painting as merely a decorative art but as a fine art form. Different from the traditional masters of the past, they work individually and sign their works. Also, their works are not illustrating books, as was the case with the original Ottoman miniatures, but are exhibited in fine art galleries.

Gallery

See also

 Culture of the Ottoman Empire
 Persian miniature
 Mughal painting

Notes

Sources

Further reading
 Osmanlı Resim Sanatı (Ottoman Painted Art), Serpil Bagci, Filiz Cagman, Gunsel Renda, Zeren Tanindi
 Aşk Estetiği (The Aesthetics of Divine Love), Beşir Ayvazoğlu
 Turkish Miniature Painting, Nurhan Atasoy, Filiz Çağman
 Turkish Miniatures: From the 13th to the 18th Century, R. Ettinghausen
 Ottoman miniatures and their downfall form the theme of the 1998 novel My Name is Red by Nobel-laureate Turkish author Orhan Pamuk.

External links

 Miniature Gallery from Levni and other famous artists
 About Surname-i Vehbi
  Miniatures from the Topkapi Museum

Ottoman culture
Islamic illuminated manuscripts
Miniature painting
Turkish art
Turkish inventions
Islamic arts of the book